The Green Wall is a 1970 Peruvian drama film directed by Armando Robles Godoy. Robles Godoy also wrote the screenplay based on his short story by the same title. The film won the Golden Hugo Award at the Chicago International Film Festival in 1970 and was selected as the Peruvian entry for the Academy Award for Best Foreign Language Film at the 42nd Academy Awards, but was not accepted as a nominee. After being released in the United States, Roger Ebert named it the 5th best film of 1972.

Cast

 Julio Alemán as Mario
 Sandra Riva as Delba
 Raúl Martin (aka) Martin Giurfa as Rómulo
 Lorena Duval as Madre de Delba
 Enrique Victoria as Padre de Delba
 Jorge Montoro as Jefe de tierras de montaña
 Juan Bautista Font as Director de colonización
 Escolástico Dávila as Escolástico

See also
 List of submissions to the 42nd Academy Awards for Best Foreign Language Film
 List of Peruvian submissions for the Academy Award for Best Foreign Language Film

References

External links
 
  with English subtitles

1970 films
Peruvian drama films
1970 romantic drama films
1970s Peruvian films
Films directed by Armando Robles Godoy
Nonlinear narrative films
1970s Spanish-language films